Elvina Kalieva (born July 27, 2003) is an American tennis player.
Kalieva has a career-high singles ranking by the Women's Tennis Association (WTA) of 200, achieved on 10 October 2022. She also has a career-high WTA doubles ranking of 199, set on 9 January 2023.

Personal life
She is the sister of Uzbek-born ice hockey player Arthur Kaliyev.

Career
Kalieva made her Grand Slam main-draw debut at the 2021 US Open, after receiving a wildcard for the mixed doubles tournament.

The following year, she made her WTA Tour debut at the 2022 Indian Wells Open as a wildcard player.

ITF Circuit finals

Singles: 3 (3 runner–ups)

Doubles: 3 (2 titles, 1 runner–up)

Junior Grand Slam finals

Doubles: 1 (runner-up)

References

External links
 
 

2003 births
Living people
American female tennis players
American people of Uzbek descent
21st-century American women